Elysium Planitia, located in the Elysium and Aeolis quadrangles, is a broad plain that straddles the equator of Mars, centered at . It lies to the south of the volcanic province of Elysium, the second largest volcanic region on the planet, after Tharsis. Elysium contains the major volcanoes Elysium Mons, Albor Tholus and Hecates Tholus. Another more ancient shield volcano, Apollinaris Mons, is situated just to the south of eastern Elysium Planitia. Within the plains, Cerberus Fossae is the only Mars location with recent volcanic eruptions. Lava flows dated no older than 0.2 million years from the present have been found, and evidence has been found that volcanic activity may have occurred as recently as 53,000 years ago. Such activity could have provided the environment, in terms of energy and chemicals, needed to support life forms.

The largest craters in Elysium Planitia are Eddie, Lockyer, and Tombaugh. The planitia also has river valleys—one of which, Athabasca Valles may be one of the youngest on Mars. On the north east side is an elongated depression called Orcus Patera, and this and some of the eastern plains were imaged in the 1965 Mariner 4 flyby.

A 2005 photo of a locale in Elysium Planitia at 5°N, 150°E by the Mars Express spacecraft shows what may be ash-covered water ice. The ice is thought to be the remains of water floods from the Cerberus Fossae fissures about 2 to 10 million years ago. The surface of the area is broken into 'plates' like broken ice floating on a lake (see below). Impact crater counts show that the plates are up to 1 million years older than the gap material, showing that the area solidified much too slowly for the material to be basaltic lava.

Overview

Exploration
NASA's InSight mission landed in Elysium Planitia on 26 November 2018.  It took off from Earth on 5 May 2018. The probe will study the internal structure of Mars and by so doing improve understanding of the planet's evolution. InSight Mars lander was able to take color pictures from the surface Elysium Planitia and sent them by radio signal back to Earth. During the descent sequence two additional items were jettisoned, the backshell with parachute, and heat shield, and they impacted in the vicinity of the lander.

In March 2017, scientists from the Jet Propulsion Laboratory announced that the landing site had been selected.

Fractured ground

Mesas

Cubes

Gallery

Interactive Mars map

See also
 Fossa (geology)
 Geography of Mars
 Geology of Mars
 List of plains on Mars
 List of quadrangles on Mars

References

External links
 Google Mars – zoomable map centered on Elysium Planitia, with three main volcanoes of Elysium visible
 Google Mars – Cerebrus Fossae fissures
 High resolution video by Seán Doran of overflight of an impact crater in Elysium Planitia with a lava vent  (1.1° S, 159.7° E)

Plains on Mars
InSight
Elysium quadrangle
Aeolis quadrangle